The FIA European Truck Racing Championship is a motorsport truck road racing series for semi-tractors which is sanctioned to the Fédération Internationale de l'Automobile and is organised by ETRA Promotion GmbH.

Champions

1985–1993

1994–2005 (FIA European Cups)

2006–current (FIA European Championships)

Goodyear Truck Cup
From 2017, the series began running the Goodyear Truck Cup within the regular drivers' championship. The competition is reserved for drivers given a "Chrome" rating by the sanctioning body; drivers are considered "Chrome" unless their past performance merits the rank of "Titan".

Notes
 Titan rank is awarded to drivers who have either A) won the ETRC championship within the previous 10 years, B) finished in the top 10 in the championship standings the previous season, C) has finished 6th or better in any super pole session in the previous season, D) is ranked gold or platinum in the FIA's driver ranking system or E) is judged to have had outstanding performance even if none of the previous conditions were met.

References

External links
 
 

 
Fédération Internationale de l'Automobile
European auto racing series